Bern or Berne is the name of several railway stations in Central Europe:

 Bern railway station in Bern, Switzerland
 Berne station (Bremen S-Bahn) in Berne, Germany
 Berne station (Hamburg U-Bahn) in Hamburg, Germany